The 2006 Grote Prijs Jef Scherens was the 40th edition of the Grote Prijs Jef Scherens cycle race and was held on 3 September 2006. The race started and finished in Leuven. The race was won by Marcel Sieberg.

General classification

References

2006
2006 in road cycling
2006 in Belgian sport